Mystery Playhouse is an American radio drama hosted by Peter Lorre which aired on the American Forces Network from July 1944 to June 1946.

The series aired during World War II specifically for the purposes of entertaining the troops serving during the war.

Premise

Mystery Playhouse was created by the American Forces Network in 1944 for the entertainment of the troops during World War II.

Every week, the series aired rebroadcasts of episodes of many popular radio shows of the time. Some include rebroadcast of The Whistler, Mr. and Mrs. North, Inner Sanctum Mystery, and The Adventures of Nero Wolfe.

Peter Lorre's way of introducing each episode was noted as "...part plot summary, and part philosophical about the human condition".

Episodes

Fifty Candles - July 25, 1944
Nightmare - November 28, 1944
The Bottle - December 12, 1944
The Letter - December 26, 1944
Deadline at Dawn - January 30, 1944
The Eleventh Juror - April 3, 1945
Lady in the Morgue - May 15, 1945
Angel Face - October 5, 1945
A Death is Caused Part I - October 12, 1945
A Death is Caused Part II - October 12, 1945
Leg Man - October 19, 1945
Ladies in Retirement - January 18, 1946
Witness for the Prosecution - May 31, 1946
Female of the Species - June 7, 1946
The Adventure of the Fa - June 14, 1946

Listen to

Audio of Mystery Playhouse

References

American radio dramas
American Forces Network radio programs
1940s American radio programs